Brest is a surname. Notable people with the surname include:

Harold Brest, 20th-century American prisoner
Jorge Romero Brest (1905–1989), Argentine art critic and curator
Lewis F. Brest (1842–1915), Union Army soldier
Martin Brest (born 1951), American filmmaker, producer, screenwriter, film editor, and actor
Paul Brest (born  1940), American academic
Vida Brest (1925–1985), Slovenian poet and writer